Vetulani is a surname of a Polish family of Italian origin, ; see the latter article for the origin and meaning of the surname. Notable people with the surname include:

 Adam Vetulani (1901–1976), legal historian
 Agnieszka Vetulani-Cęgiel (born 1981), political scientist
 Armand Vetulani (1909–1994), art historian
 Cecylia Vetulani (1908–1980), art historian and conservator
 Franciszek Vetulani (1856–1921), engineer and official
 Grażyna Vetulani (born 1956), philologist and linguist
 Irena Latinik-Vetulani (1904–1975), biologist
 Jerzy Vetulani (1936–2017), neuroscientist and pharmacologist
 Kazimierz Vetulani (1889–1941), engineer and construction theorist
 Kristine Vetulani-Belfoure (1924–2004), teacher, translator and writer
 Maria Vetulani de Nisau (1898–1944), combatant for Poland's independence
 Roman Vetulani (1849–1908), high school professor
 Tadeusz Vetulani (1897–1952), biologist and zootechnician
 Tomasz Vetulani (born 1965), painter and sculptor
 Zofia Vetulani (1893–1981), civil servant, social and political activist
 Zygmunt Vetulani (diplomat) (1894–1942), diplomat and economist
 Zygmunt Vetulani (computer scientist) (born 1950), mathematician and computer scientist

See also

Italian-language surnames
Polish-language surnames
Polish people of Italian descent